The Mercury Cycling Team was an American professional cycling team. It was founded in 1992 as an amateur team by John Wordin and Thurlow Rogers, with Mrs. Gooch's Natural Foods Markets as the lead sponsor in 1992 and 1994. Before Mercury took over title sponsorship from 1998–1999 and 2001–2002 the team raced under various title sponsors including Miller Lite (1993), Nutra Fig (1995–1996), Comptel Data Systems (1997), and Manheim Auctions (2000).

The team was named Velo News North American Team of the Year from 1996 to 2002 and won 535 races from 1998 to 2002. The team was disbanded after the 2002 season.

Main riders
Léon van Bon (2001)
Baden Cooke (2000–2001)
Tom Danielson (2002)
Julian Dean (1998)
Fabrizio Guidi (2001)
Chris Horner (1993–1996, 1998–2001)
Jans Koerts (2001)
Floyd Landis (1999–2001)
Peter Van Petegem (2001)
Thurlow Rogers (1992–2002)
Pavel Tonkov (2001)
Jonathan Vaughters (1997)
Henk Vogels (2000–2002)
Steve Zampieri (2000)
Gord Fraser (1998–2002)
Levi Leipheimer (1997)
Derek Bouchard-Hall (1999–2002)
Mike Sayers (1998–2002)
John Peters (1993–2000)
David Clinger (1993–1999)
Will Frischkorn (2000–2002)
Rahsaan Bahati (2000–2002)
Scott Moninger (1999–2002)
Chris Wherry (2001–2002)
Kirk Willet (1993-2000)
Ernesto Lechuga (1998-2002)

Junior/U23 Development riders
Danny Pate (1996)
Michael Creed (1996)
Derek Wilkerson (1996)
Tyler Farrar (2002)
Wil Frischkorn (1999)

References

Defunct cycling teams based in the United States
Cycling teams established in 1995
Cycling teams disestablished in 2002